Nightlife is an album by Cobra Verde, released in 1999 through Motel Records.

Production
The album was recorded by frontman John Petkovic and bass player Don Depew. Ralph Carney played saxophone on "Crashing in a Plane".

Critical reception
The Washington Post called the album "a glam-revival romp that invokes the spirit of David Bowie, Roxy Music and (in the closing 'Pontius Pilate') Kurt Weill and Bertolt Brecht." The Cleveland Scene wrote that "Nightlife has all the flavor of classic rock and roll without sounding too obviously retro." 

Exclaim! thought that "Huey Lewis-like sax-rock spews forth on 'What Makes A Man A Man', and [the band's] new grasp on glam bleeds through on cuts like 'Casino'." The Washington City Paper praised the "literate, smart-aleck lyrics." Salon deemed the album "a tight, heavy, guitar-and-chirping-synth version of glam rock written sideways."

Track listing

Personnel 
Cobra Verde
Don Depew – bass guitar, guitar, recording
Doug Gillard – guitar, keyboards, vocals
John Petkovic – vocals, guitar, keyboards
Production and additional personnel
Cobra Verde – production

References 

1999 albums
Cobra Verde (band) albums